Collinsville Township is located in Madison County, Illinois, in the United States. As of the 2010 census, its population was 36,265 and it contained 16,407 housing units.

History
Collinsville Township takes its name from the city of Collinsville.

Geography

Demographics

References

External links
City-data.com
Illinois State Archives

Townships in Madison County, Illinois
Townships in Illinois